Connie Francis sings German Favorites is a studio album of German songs recorded by U.S. entertainer Connie Francis.

Background
Unlike the other installments in Francis' series of "Favorites" albums, Connie Francis sings German Favorites does not focus on the traditional songs of a certain country or ethnic group. Beginning in 1960 with the overwhelming success of Die Liebe ist ein seltsames Spiel, a German version of her U.S. No. 1 hit Everybody's Somebody's Fool, Francis had established herself in Germany as a respected performer of contemporary German music. By the time of the album's release, Francis had enjoyed six No. 1 hits on the German charts. Hence, Connie Francis sings German Favorites is more of a typical pop Greatest Hits Album.

Originally scheduled for release in late spring 1963, the album was not released until January 1964 because of the delayed release of Francis' 1962 album Connie Francis sings Award Winning Motion Picture Hits, which had been scheduled for release in June 1962 but did not hit the shops until May 1963.

Track listing

Side A

Side B

References

External links
Official Connie Francis Fan Club Site

Connie Francis albums
1964 albums
German-language albums
MGM Records albums
Albums produced by Danny Davis (country musician)